Edward Osei-Nketia (born 8 May 2001) is a New Zealand sprinter.

Osei-Nketia is the son of Gus Nketia, the former New Zealand national 100 m record holder. In 2019, after winning the Australian national title at 100 m, he confirmed his national allegiance to New Zealand. On 15 July 2022, he broke his father's the national record by running 10.08 at the 2022 World Athletics Championships in Oregon. Osei-Nketia spent his last secondary school years at Scots College in Wellington.

International representation 
In June 2019, Osei-Nketia won the title of the 100 m at the Oceania Championships in Townsville.

On 28 September 2019 he came fifth in his heat of the first round of the 100m at the World Athletics Championships in Doha, Qatar with a time of 10.24s, missing out on a semi-final berth by 0.01s. Osei-Nketia won the 2019 Australian Athletics Championships 100m in 10.22 after running a personal best of 10.19 in the semi-final. 

On 27 March 2021 he ran 10.12 in Brisbane, ranking him second on the New Zealand all-time list, 0.01 sec behind the National Record set by his father, Gus Nketia, in 1994, and qualifying him by ranking for the 2020 Summer Olympics, but he was not nominated.

Osei-Nketia broke his father's 100m record in finishing second in the 7th heat of the 100m 2022 World Athletics Championships in 10.08 seconds (wind -0.315m/s) on 15 July 2022.

Domestic achievements 
At the New Zealand National Track and Field champs in 2019 Osei-Nketia won the senior men's 100m. He followed this in 2020 by winning both the senior 100m and 200m, a feat he repeated in 2022.

References

External links
IAAF
NZ Rankings

New Zealand male sprinters
2001 births
Living people
New Zealand people of Ghanaian descent
Athletes from Auckland